Park Ho-hyun (born 21 March 1978) is a South Korean female javelin thrower. This made her the Asian champion that year ahead of her compatriot Lee Young-sun. She was the sole gold medallist for the host nation at the event. In her younger years she won medals at the Asian Junior Athletics Championships in 1996 and 1997.

International competitions

References

External links

Living people
1978 births
South Korean female javelin throwers